Cryptanthus bivittatus, (commonly known as Earth star) is a small, terrestrial species of plant in the family Bromeliaceae.  Reaching a height of only 6 - 8 inches and preferring moderate or diffuse light, it is commonly used in terrariums and novelty planters.

The cultivar 'Pink Starlite' has received the Royal Horticultural Society's Award of Garden Merit.

References

Regel, Index Seminum (LE) 1864: 15 (1864)

bivittatus